The Mixed Pairs BC3 boccia competition at the 2004 Summer Paralympics was held from 26 to 28 September at the Ano Liosia Olympic Hall.

The event was won by Park Seong Hyeon and An Myung Hoon, representing .

Results

Preliminaries

Pool U

Pool V

Competition bracket

References

X